Earle may refer to:

 Earle (given name)
 Earle (surname)

Places
 Earle, Arkansas, a city in Crittenden County, Arkansas, US
 Earle, Indiana, an unincorporated town in Vanderburgh County, Indiana, US
 Earle, Northumberland, a settlement in Berwick-upon-Tweed, Northumberland, England
 Naval Weapons Station Earle, a US Navy base on Sandy Hook Bay in New Jersey

See also
 
 Earl
 Earles (disambiguation)